Ron Biondo (born August 10, 1981 in Broadview Heights, Ohio) is a short track speed skater from the United States who won bronze in the 500 m at the 2002 World Short Track Speed Skating Championships.

References

External links
Ron Biondo at Sports-Reference.com
Ron Biondo at ISU

1981 births
Living people
American male short track speed skaters
Olympic short track speed skaters of the United States
Short track speed skaters at the 2002 Winter Olympics
World Short Track Speed Skating Championships medalists